The Tui Golf Championship Fleesensee was a men's senior (over 50) professional golf tournament on the European Seniors Tour, held on the Schloss course at the Golfclub Fleesensee near Fleesensee, Göhren-Lebbin, Mecklenburg-Vorpommern in north-east Germany. It was held just once, in September 2000, and was won by Jeff Van Wagenen who finished a shot ahead of Tommy Horton and Noel Ratcliffe. The total prize fund was €200,000 with the winner receiving €32,750.

Winners

References

External links
Coverage on the European Senior Tour's official site

Former European Senior Tour events
Golf tournaments in Germany